Joseph Hawdon (14 November 1813 – 12 April 1871) was a pioneer settler and overlander of Australia, and pioneer and politician of New Zealand.

Early life
Hawdon was born at Wackerfield, Durham, England, the son of John Hawdon. At the suggestion of his elder brother John Hawdon (1801–1881) who had arrived in Sydney in 1828, he decided to travel to Australia, arriving at Sydney in November 1834.

Overlanding
In 1836, Hawdon, together with John Gardiner and John Hepburn, made an overland journey to Melbourne with cattle, the first to come from New South Wales. Hawdon returned briefly to Sydney, but moved to Melbourne in 1837, and in August of that year he took up land near the present site of Dandenong.

Towards the end of the year, the newly-established South Australian settlement was threatened with famine. Sensing a commercial opportunity, Hawdon returned to New South Wales where, along with Charles Bonney and Charles Campbell, he put together an expedition to drove 300 head of cattle from the Goulburn district to Adelaide, where they arrived on 3 April 1838.  Following the course of the Murray River, along the route they found two fine lakes – Lake Victoria, in the western Riverina region of New South Wales, and Lake Bonney in north-eastern South Australia. Hawdon named the first after Queen Victoria and the second after his companion. Charles Sturt, in an official report made in August 1838, said of this journey: "Messrs Hawdon and Bonney could not have taken a more direct line or shortened the journey more wisely".

Having beaten other aspiring overlanders, including John Hill and Edward John Eyre, Hawdon and Lieutenant Alfred Mundy left Melbourne on an expedition to Adelaide on 11 July 1839, travelling north-north-west to Expedition Pass, near present-day Castlemaine, and stopping at various squatter stations. They reached the Hentys' station near Casterton on 25 July, camped at Lake Mundy (a freshwater lake which Holloway named after Hawdon's companion) on 27 July, and then followed the tracks of the Holloway party, which they caught on 2 August. Travelling close to the coast through The Coorong, they crossed the Murray on 8 August and arrived in Adelaide on 11 August.

Settler of Victoria
Hawdon became the official mail contractor between Melbourne and Yass at the beginning of 1838. He made his headquarters at or near Melbourne for many years, and was one of the directors of the Pastoral and Agricultural Society when it was formed in 1840, and a member of the committee of the Victorian Horticultural Society which was inaugurated in November 1848. He had a property at Heidelberg, named Banyule and in August 1851 discovered a few grains of gold near the Yarra River. He remained in Australia until 1858 and then returned to England.

New Zealand
In 1863 Hawdon took up land between Christchurch and Westland, New Zealand, and afterwards spent some years in England. He returned to New Zealand and was nominated to the New Zealand Legislative Council in 1866, where he served for the rest of his life. He died at Christchurch on 12 April 1871.

Hawdon River and Lake Hawdon are named after him. He married in 1842 Emma (daughter of W. Outhwaite) who died in 1853. His eldest daughter Emma Josephine married Robert Campbell on 2 December 1868 in Christchurch, and his daughter Alice married Edward Wingfield Humphreys on 22 April 1869 at St John the Baptist Church in Christchurch.

See also
Lake Hawdon (South Australia)

References

Alan Gross, 'Hawdon, Joseph (1813–1871)', Australian Dictionary of Biography, Volume 1, MUP, 1966, p. 524. Retrieved 1 February 2009

1813 births
1871 deaths
English emigrants to New Zealand
Settlers of Melbourne
Members of the New Zealand Legislative Council
19th-century New Zealand politicians